Bibhashwori Rai (born 25 March 1970) is a Nepalese sports shooter. She competed in the women's 10 metre air rifle event at the 1996 Summer Olympics.

References

1970 births
Living people
Nepalese female sport shooters
Olympic shooters of Nepal
Shooters at the 1996 Summer Olympics
Place of birth missing (living people)
Shooters at the 2002 Asian Games
Asian Games competitors for Nepal
20th-century Nepalese women
21st-century Nepalese women